The Curse is an upcoming American comedy television series created and written by Nathan Fielder and Benny Safdie, and starring Emma Stone, Fielder and Safdie. The series filmed from June to October 2022 and will premiere on Showtime.

Premise
The series will explore "how an alleged curse disturbs the relationship of a newly married couple as they try to conceive a child while co-starring on their problematic new HGTV show, Flipanthropy.

Cast
 Nathan Fielder as the husband of Stone's character and co-star of the HGTV show
 Emma Stone as the wife of Fielder's character and co-star of the HGTV show
 Benny Safdie as the producer of the HGTV show
 Corbin Bernsen
 Barkhad Abdi
 Constance Shulman

Production
The Curse was given the green-light by Showtime in February 2020. The half-hour comedy series was created and written by Nathan Fielder and Benny Safdie.  Principal photography took place in Santa Fe, New Mexico and Española from June 2022 to early October 2022.

References

External links
 
 

2020s American comedy television series
English-language television shows
Showtime (TV network) original programming
Upcoming comedy television series
Television series about couples
Television series about television
Television series by A24